Cheryl Hickey (born January 8, 1976) is host of ET Canada, an entertainment news magazine for Global Television Network which launched on September 12, 2005.

Early life
Born in Owen Sound, Ontario, to John Patrick Hickey (1942 - January 13, 2023) and Lori Hickey (née Laycock). Cheryl attended West Hill Secondary School in Owen Sound, where she was Student Council President. At the age of 17 while working at a local cable station, Cheryl got the "Mass media bug" and since then knew she wanted to be a reporter. She attended Fanshawe College in London, Ontario where she studied Radio and Television Arts.

Career
After graduating, she returned to Owen Sound where she worked at the K106.5, first as a correspondent and later as an afternoon news anchor.

A year-and-a-half later, she moved on to The New VR in Barrie, Ontario. There she worked initially as a production assistant, then later became a writer for their six o'clock newscast. At the same time, she learned how to operate a camera and film the news.

In May 1999 she joined the Global Television Network where she worked as a photojournalist and as a news chopper reporter. In 2001, she moved on to reporting on the entertainment beat for Global.

Hickey produced the documentary special 10 Wired Days, a backstage pass to the festival. Other events she covered for Global include the Grammy Countdown 2004 pre-show in New York City, the Rolling Stones benefit concert (also known as SARSstock), the Toronto Molson Indy, and a live pre-show for Canada's Walk of Fame.

In September 2005, she became the host of ET Canada.

Personal life
On the eve of February 4 she announced on ET Canada that she was engaged. In April 2008, during a talk show discussion on Toronto sports radio channel The FAN 590, it was reported that Cheryl Hickey was engaged to Rogers Sportsnet producer Kevin Foley. They were married on October 19, 2008 in Toronto, Ontario.

On April 23, 2009, a Canadian entertainment website confirmed the news that she was pregnant with her first child, and on October 15, 2009, Hickey announced on her Twitter that son Jaxson had arrived. In 2012, Hickey announced on Entertainment Tonight Canada that she was pregnant with her second child. On April 17, 2013 she gave birth to daughter Nyla.

References

External links

Cheryl Hickey's bio from ET Canada

Canadian television hosts
Canadian infotainers
People from Owen Sound
1976 births
Living people
Fanshawe College alumni
Canadian people of Irish descent
Canadian people of English descent
Canadian women television journalists
Global Television Network people
Canadian women television hosts